"Breathless" is a song by English singer Shayne Ward. It was released on 19 November 2007 as the second and final single from his second studio album Breathless (2007). It peaked at number six on the UK Singles Chart.

Background and promotion
"Breathless" tells a tale about a woman who is so wonderful, she can take a man's breath away. Ward conceived the song possibly during his relationship with his then-girlfriend Faye McKeever.

Promotion for the single was very limited; which would explain the relatively moderate chart position of the song when compared
to his previous singles. The only live performances shown to the public were when Ward performed the song during the results show in the fourth series of The X Factor on 10 November 2007, BBC Switch: Sound on 17 November 2007, and on  The Paul O'Grady Show on 19 November 2007.

Chart performance
"Breathless" entered the UK Singles Chart on 25 November 2007 at number 6. It was number 4 on the HMV Official Singles Chart. The song has so far sold 102,000 copies in the UK.

Legacy
On Valentine's Day 2008, "Breathless" was announced as number 2 on the UK's greatest love songs of all time.

Usage in other media
The single was used in episode 7 of the Korean drama You're Beautiful.

Charts

Weekly charts

Year-end charts

References

2007 songs
Shayne Ward songs
Songs written by Rami Yacoub
Songs written by Savan Kotecha
Songs written by Arnthor Birgisson
2007 singles
Sony BMG singles
Contemporary R&B ballads